Drumaness Mills Football Club is a Northern Irish, intermediate football club based in Drumaness, near Ballynahinch, and playing in the Premier Division of the Northern Amateur Football League.

History
Formed in 1929 the club, nicknamed "the Mills", took membership of the Northern Amateur Football League Second Division upon their foundation. They left the league in 1941, returned briefly in 1950 then left again before re-taking membership in 1954. They have remained in the league ever since.

Their first trophy was the Division 1B Athletics Stores Cup won in the 1960–61 season, but subsequently won the NAFL four times, four Border Regiment Cups and three Clarence Cups.

Meadowvale
Their home ground, Meadowvale, was opened on Saturday, 1 August 1992 with a friendly against Cliftonville.

Honours

Intermediate honours
Northern Amateur Football League: 4
1981–82, 1983–84, 1988–89, 2013–14
Clarence Cup: 3
1992–93, 1993–94, 2013–14
Border Cup: 4
1977–78, 1978–79, 1980–81, 1986–87
Gary winthorpe memorial cup 1969
John boaner super cup 2000,2002,2004
Dave Dickson 5 aside power trophy

References

External links
 Official Website (archived version)
 nifootball.co.uk - (For fixtures, results and tables of all Northern Ireland amateur football leagues)

Association football clubs in Northern Ireland
Association football clubs established in 1929
Association football clubs in County Down
Northern Amateur Football League clubs
1929 establishments in Northern Ireland